Patrick Francis Sheehan (28 May 1932 – 8 November 2012) was the Roman Catholic bishop of the Roman Catholic Dioceses of Yola and later Kano, Nigeria.

Patrick Sheehan was born in Boyle, County Roscommon, Ireland on May 28, 1932. His parents later moved to Tramore, County Waterford. When he entered the Novitiate of the Order of St Augustine at Orlagh, near Dublin he was given the name Francis. Patrick Francis Sheehan's priestly studies were in the Gregorian University in Rome. There he was ordained priest on February 25, 1956. He was posted to the Adamawa Mission assigned to the Irish Province of the Order of St Augustine by the Holy See. There he spent most of the rest of his life. Bishop Sheehan was ordained as Bishop of Yola in Yola on January 6, 1971. 

In his time as a priest of Yola, Bishop Sheehan established the Third Order of St Augustine in the diocese under the authority of the Prior General in Rome. He was instrumental in bringing the Spiritans (C.S.Sp.), the De La Salle Brothers (F.S.C.) the Sisters of the Infant Jesus (I.J.), the Holy Rosary Sisters (M.S.H.R.), the Nigerian Mercy Sisters (D.D.D.M.) and Nigerian Divine Love Sisters (D.D.L.) to Yola Diocese. He invited the enclosed Discalced Carmelite Sisters (O.C.D.) of New Ross, Ireland to establish a monastery in Yola. The first nuns arrived in 1993. They chose Zing and the monastery opened in 1995.

On February 3, 1995, the Diocese of Jalingo was erected from the Diocese of Yola under the leadership of Bishop Sheehan. The De La Salle Brothers, the Holy Rosary Sisters and the Nigerian Mercy Sisters have since left both jurisdictions.

On July 5, 1996, Bishop Sheehan was then transferred to Kano which was then an Apostolic Vicariate, i.e. not yet a diocese. Kano subsequently became a diocese on June 22, 1999. He retired in 2008. By then Bishop Sheehan had already returned to Ireland because of ill-health. 

Bishop Patrick Francis Sheehan was found dead in his room in the Augustinian Priory of John's Lane, Dublin, on November 8, 2012. He was buried in St Patrick's Cemetery, Tramore, Co. Waterford

Notes

1932 births
2012 deaths
Irish expatriate Catholic bishops
20th-century Roman Catholic bishops in Nigeria
21st-century Roman Catholic bishops in Nigeria
Roman Catholic bishops of Yola
Roman Catholic bishops of Kano